Elliotte Friedman (born September 27, 1970) is a Canadian sports journalist.  He currently serves as a hockey reporter for Sportsnet and as an insider for the NHL Network. He is a regular panelist on CBC's Hockey Night in Canada.

Early life and education 
Friedman attended the University of Western Ontario and worked at the student newspaper The Gazette as a sports editor and eventually served as editor-in-chief in 1992–93. Friedman was born and raised in a middle-class Jewish home.

Career
Friedman began his broadcast career for Toronto sports radio station The Fan 590 in 1994. He did play-by-play for Toronto Raptors games on both radio and television and reported on Toronto Blue Jays games in 1998. He also did freelance work for the London Free Press and the Toronto Star.

Friedman was awarded the Telemedia Reporter of the Year award in 1996. Friedman then worked for The Score network before joining CBC Sports in 2003. At CBC, Friedman was a reporter for Hockey Night in Canada; the studio host for the final two seasons of the CFL on CBC and for some Toronto Raptors games; and participated in the CBC's Olympic Games coverage. Friedman began reporting on the CFL in 2006, after Brian Williams moved to CTV/TSN. In 2011, Friedman received the Best Sports Reporting Gemini Award for his efforts on Hockey Night in Canada's Heritage Classic. He also continued to appear regularly on The Fan 590 (now Sportsnet 590). After Rogers Media acquired exclusive national media rights to the NHL and began producing Hockey Night for CBC, Friedman was hired by Sportsnet to continue his role.

In 2016, Friedman participated as a commentator during CBC's coverage of diving and swimming events at the 2016 Summer Olympics to replace Steve Armitage (who was unable to attend the Games due to his diagnosis with chronic heart failure). 

On August 11, 2016, Friedman received international attention after making a mistake in his commentary of the Men's 200 metre individual medley final; Friedman declared that U.S. swimmer Ryan Lochte was leading and had won the race, when it was actually won by his rival, Michael Phelps.

Personal life
Friedman is married to a former television producer.

References

1970 births
Living people
Canadian Football League announcers
Jewish Canadian journalists
Canadian radio sportscasters
Canadian television sportscasters
Journalists from Toronto
Major League Baseball broadcasters
National Basketball Association broadcasters
National Hockey League broadcasters
Toronto Blue Jays announcers
Olympic Games broadcasters
Toronto Raptors announcers
University of Western Ontario alumni
American Hockey League broadcasters
Swimming commentators
20th-century Canadian people
21st-century Canadian people